The Matsuyama City  is a museum devoted mainly to the life and work of Japanese writer Masaoka Shiki, who was born and raised in Matsuyama. 
Shiki is widely considered to be the most important figure in the modernization of both haiku and tanka poetry. The museum also includes exhibits about the early history of Matsuyama.

References

External links
Matsuyama City Shiki Memorial Museum official English page

Museums established in 1981
Poetry museums
Biographical museums in Japan
Literary museums in Japan
City museums in Japan
Museums in Ehime Prefecture
1981 establishments in Japan
Matsuyama, Ehime